Josef Berger, or Joseph Isadore Berger (May 12, 1903 – November 11, 1971), was an American journalist, author and speechwriter.

Early life
Berger was born in Denver, Colorado in 1903 and graduated from the University of Missouri School of Journalism in 1924. He worked as a reporter for the Kansas City Star for a time.

Career
In 1924, Berger moved to New York, where he worked as a reporter and editor for ten years. In 1928, he began writing juvenile books, making his debut with Captain Bib, which was published in 1929. He published a total of twenty books, in addition to writing short stories and articles for publications such as Atlantic Monthly, The New Yorker, Esquire, Reader's Digest, McCall's, and The New York Times Sunday Magazine.

In 1934, he settled with his wife and daughter in Provincetown, Massachusetts where he tried to make it as a freelance writer. Berger had a hard time earning money and for about year lived in poverty until he found a job with the government-sponsored Federal Writer's Project. His 1937 Cape Cod Pilot became a success and enabled him to obtain a Guggenheim Foundation Fellowship the next year, which he used to write In Great Waters, a history of the Portuguese in New England. He received another Guggenheim Fellowship in 1946.

Berger, who wrote under the pen name Jeremiah Digges, went to Washington, D.C. in 1940 to become the editor of reports for the U.S. House of Representative Select Committee to Investigate Interstate Migration of Destitute Citizens. In 1941 he worked in the same capacity for the U.S. Senate Committee on Wartime Health and Education.

Berger was employed by the United States Department of Justice in 1942 as a speech-writer for the Attorney-General, Francis Biddle. From 1944–1947, he worked as chief speechwriter for the Democratic National Committee, where he was a special assistant to its chairman Robert E. Hannegan, and prepared speeches for him, as well as for various Democratic politicians, such as Harry Truman, Tom Clark, Henry Wallace, Lyndon Johnson, Sam Rayburn and Estes Kefauver. He also wrote a speech for Franklin D. Roosevelt Although the president died the day before the speech was scheduled, the speech was subsequently published and widely quoted. Berger also served as chief of press relations for the Allied Commission on Reparations in London, Paris, Berlin, Pottsdam, and Moscow during 1945. Between 1947 and 1950 he wrote scripts for daytime television shows. In 1950, he became a chief speechwriter for the March of Dimes, and from 1955–1968 its chief speechwriter.

He continued with free-lance writing throughout his life. His production also covered poetry and song lyrics, including a record called The Babysitters with Alan Arkin and Lee Hays. From 1960–1962, he wrote for The New York Times Magazine, McCall's, and others.

He also wrote a book named "Bowleg Bill, The Sea-Going Cowboy"

Contacts with KGB
The Venona project has revealed that Berger was approached by the KGB after a lead by Samuel Krafsur. In a KGB message to Moscow in 1945, he is described as a progressive and as well disposed toward the Soviet Union. According to Krafsur, Berger had expressed a wish to live in the USSR and maintained contacts with the Communist Party USA. There is no indication, however, that he was actually recruited as an agent. The fact that he quit government work soon afterwards may indicate that the plans to recruit him came to nothing, or even that he wished to avoid involvement in espionage.

Death
At the age of 67, he died suddenly of an aneurysm on November 11, 1971 in New York City.

References

 FBI Venona Files
 Marcia and Thomas Mitchell, The Spy Who Seduced America: Lies and Betrayal in the Heat of the Cold War: The Judith Coplon Story, (Invisible Cities Press LLC, 2002)

External links
Guide to the Josef Berger papers at the University of Oregon

1903 births
1971 deaths
American speechwriters
University of Missouri alumni
Massachusetts Democrats
20th-century American non-fiction writers